Gustavus Remak Ramsay (born February 2, 1937) is an American veteran stage, film and television actor. Ramsay was born in Baltimore, Maryland, the son of Caroline V. (née Remak) and John Breckinridge Ramsay.

Stage plays
Half a Sixpence (1965–66), as Young Walshingham
Lovely Ladies (1970), as Captain McLean
Sheep on the Runway (1970), as Edward Snelling
On the Town (1971), as Ozzie
Jumpers (1974), as Archie
Private Lives (1975), as Victor Prynne
Dirty Linen & New-Found-Land (1977), as Cocklebury-Smythe, M.P.
Landscape of the Body (1978), as Durwood Peach
The Dining Room (1981), as 1st Actor
The Devil's Disciple (1988), as Anthony Anderson
Nick & Nora (1991), as Max Bernheim
Saint Joan (1993), as Chaplain de Stogumber
The Heiress (1995), as Dr. Austin Sloper
The Molière Comedies (1995), as Ariste/Gorgibus

Selected filmography
The Front (1976), as Hennessey
Class (1983), as Kennedy
Shadows and Fog (1988), as Senator Byington
Mr. and Mrs. Bridge (1990), as Virgil Barron
King of the Hill (1993), as Principal Stillwater
Addicted to Love (1997), as Professor Wells
Julie & Julia (2009), as John McWilliams

TV appearances
Truman (1995), as Dean Acheson (film)
Law & Order (2000), as Ambassador Peter Sarno (Amends, episode #236)
Law & Order: Criminal Intent (2002), as Doug Lafferty (Faith, episode #21)

Awards
Drama Desk Award Outstanding Actor in a Play
1981 nominee, for The Winslow Boy
1983 nominee, for Quartermaine's Terms

References

External links

1937 births
Living people
American male film actors
American male stage actors
American male television actors
Male actors from Baltimore
20th-century American male actors
21st-century American male actors